Aubrey Shea Peeples (born November 27, 1993) is an American actress and singer. She is known for her role as Layla Grant in the ABC drama series Nashville. She can be seen in the upcoming series Unconventional by show-runner Kit Williamson as Margot, a bipolar woman coming to terms with her mental health. She also led Carrie Brownstein's pilot Search & Destroy for Hulu based on her band Sleater-Kinney. Peeples played the lead role in the musical fantasy film Jem and the Holograms (2015). Her writing and directorial debut Decadeless premiered at the Portland Oregon Women's Film Festival in 2019.

Early life 
Aubrey Shea Peeples was born and raised in Lake Mary, Florida, by parents Wendy and Ashley, and has a younger sister named Ally. Growing up, Peeples performed with the Orlando Repertory Theatre for ten years. She graduated from Lake Mary Preparatory School, where she was valedictorian of the class of 2012. Peeples was accepted to Harvard University but deferred entry twice, the second time to accept her role on Nashville.

Career 
Peeples has guest-starred in Drop Dead Diva, Burn Notice, Austin & Ally, Grey's Anatomy, and she had a recurring role on Necessary Roughness. She has also appeared in the made-for-television movies Ace Ventura Jr.: Pet Detective, The Good Mother and Sharknado.

She was cast in a major recurring role, playing Layla Grant, a runner-up in a reality singing competition and rising country star, in the second season of the ABC drama series Nashville. She was later promoted to regular status for Nashvilles fourth season. However, Peeples did not return for the show's fifth season when Nashville moved to CMT.

In 2014, Peeples was cast as lead character in the romantic musical fantasy comedy-drama film Jem and the Holograms, based on the 1980s television show of the same name. The same year Peeples co-starred in the crime thriller Rage opposite Nicolas Cage. In September 2014, Peeples was named one of the best actors under the age of twenty by Indiewire.

In 2019, Peeples opened up about having bipolar disorder in an interview with NKD Magazine.

Filmography

Film

Television

References

External links 

 
 

1993 births
Living people
21st-century American actresses
Actresses from Florida
American child actresses
American film actresses
American television actresses
American women singers
People from Lake Mary, Florida
People with bipolar disorder